"Miracle" is the fifth single released from the fifth Foo Fighters album, In Your Honor. It was released as a promotional single only and no retail single was released. John Paul Jones from Led Zeppelin plays piano on this song.

Track listing
All songs written by Dave Grohl, Taylor Hawkins, Nate Mendel and Chris Shiflett.
 "Miracle" – 3:29
 "Suggested Callout Hook" – 0:10

Appearances in media
In The West Wing episode "Election Day Part II," the band is seen playing this song at a campaign party for Democratic Presidential candidate Matt Santos. "Miracle" has also appeared in episodes of Scrubs and Cold Case.

Charts

References

Songs written by Dave Grohl
Foo Fighters songs
2006 singles
2005 songs
Songs written by Taylor Hawkins
RCA Records singles
Songs written by Nate Mendel
Songs written by Chris Shiflett
Song recordings produced by Nick Raskulinecz